KCSY (106.3 FM, "Sunny FM") is a radio station broadcasting out of Twisp, Washington.

External links
KCSYFM.com

CSY
Radio stations established in 1973
1973 establishments in Washington (state)
Oldies radio stations in the United States